The Opposites are a Dutch rap group, consisting of rappers  (Willy) and Twan van Steenhoven (Big2). The two started rapping when de Bruin had to write a rap for his teacher as a punishment. Willem realized his rap potential and decided to continue rapping, together with friend Twan van Steenhoven he became addicted to Hip hop, so they say. The name The Opposites is a reference to the fact that Willem is short and a person of color, whereas Twan is tall and white.

Early years

After participating in a demo contest on the internet The Opposites got in touch with Mastermind Records which wanted to make a follow up on the very popular album Streetremixes from D-men. The group contributed to both Streetremixes 2 and 3, along with other rappers like: Yes-R, Brace, Lange Frans and Baas B. They made their album debut with "Youngsters" in 2005, which included mostly English lyrics. After "Youngsters" the two decided to start rapping in Dutch. The duo made a mixtape "Vuur" which can be downloaded on internet for free and has been played on Dutch radio. In order to start working on a studio album, The Opposites made their label switch to TopNotch. The same year the duo made a real name with their coöperation on the hit single Wat Wil Je Doen from The Partysquad and their own single Fok Jou from their then still unreleased album De Fik Erin. Their album De Fik Erin was released in late 2005 and the second single from this album was released in early 2006: Slaap. Slaap is The Opposites first big hit and reached number seven on the Mega Top 50.

Later years

In 2007, The Opposites released their second studio album: Begin Twintig. This album contains the hit Dom, Lomp en Famous, a single with simple lyrics that became very popular in the Netherlands. The album contains 16 songs, Twan (big2) produced the beats for 15 of them which is unusual, as the beats are usually produced by producers and not by the rappers themselves. In 2007 the rappers won their first set of awards. In 2006 they were nominated for some awards but didn't actually win one. Out of the six awards they won in 2007, two where for their song Dom, Lomp en Famous. In 2008 they started touring through Spain with The Partysquad and later through the Netherlands with their show Op Volle Toeren with Flinke Namen and Dio. They made a mixtape with the same name as their show: Op Volle Toeren, containing their work they did with Dio and Flinke Namen. The Opposites also released the hit single Vandaag. The same year the album Rock & Roll from Dio is released, Twan produced the beats for almost all of the tracks including the hit single Tijdmachine.
When Twan went on a vacation Willem still wanted to make music so he tried a studio session with the producer team SoundG8. The first session went well so he wanted to continue working with them. Twan also liked the idea of not having to share the microphone for once, so they decide to make their own albums. This resulted in the next studio album, a double CD with one album from Twan alone and one from Willem. This album also contains the hit Broodje Bakpau made for the Dutch comedy series New Kids and the single Licht Uit. The double CD contains the albums: Ik Ben Twan from Big2 and Succes from Willem.

Discography

Albums

Singles

Sources

Dutch musical duos
Hip hop duos
Musical groups established in 2004
Musical groups disestablished in 2014